Winding Stair may refer to:

The Winding Stair, a band from Belfast, Northern Ireland
The Winding Stair, a 1923 novel by A. E. W. Mason
 The Winding Stair a 1925 silent film based on the novel
Winding Stair Mountain National Recreation Area, located in Oklahoma
The Winding Stair and Other Poems, a volume of poetry by W. B. Yeats

See also
Spiral staircases, a 'winding' helical type of stairway